The IMOCA 60 Class yacht Arkéa Paprec, FRA 4 was designed by Juan Kouyoumdjian and launched on 19 July 2019 after being built CDK Technologies in Port La Forêtin, France

Racing results

Timeline
During the 2020-2021 Vendee Globe on day 25 the starboard foil were damaged following collision with floating object forcing the boat to retire unaided to Cape Town.

References 

Individual sailing yachts
2010s sailing yachts
Sailboat type designs by Juan Kouyoumdjian
Sailboat types built in France
Vendée Globe boats
IMOCA 60
CDK Technologies